Spencer's frog may refer to:

 Spencer's burrowing frog (Opisthodon spenceri), a frog in the family Myobatrachidae native to western and central Australia
 Spencer's river tree frog (Litoria spenceri), a frog in the family Hylidae endemic to Australia

Animal common name disambiguation pages